Belle Adair may refer to:
 Belle Adair (band)
 Belle Adair (actress)